Falsilunatia patagonica is a species of predatory sea snail, a marine gastropod mollusc in the family Naticidae, the moon snails.

Distribution
This marine species occurs off the Falklands, Argentina, Tierra del Fuego, the Strait of Magellan, Chile and South Georgia .

Description 
The size of an adult shell varies between 12 mm and 30 mm.

Habitat 
Minimum recorded depth is 18 m. Maximum recorded depth is 1886 m.

References

 Torigoe K. & Inaba A. (2011) Revision on the classification of Recent Naticidae. Bulletin of the Nishinomiya Shell Museum 7: 133 + 15 pp., 4 pls

External links
 

Naticidae
Gastropods described in 1845